Marcus Regis Coco (born 24 June 1996) is a French professional footballer who plays as a midfielder for Ligue 1 club Nantes.

Club career
Coco is a youth exponent from EA Guingamp. He made his Ligue 1 debut on 1 February 2015 against Girondins de Bordeaux starting the match and being substituted after 60 minutes for Lionel Mathis.

He made his 10th appearance in the 2016–17 season by scoring a brace in a 1–3 away win over Lyon on 22 October 2016.

In July 2019, following Guingamp's relegation from Ligue 1, Coco joined FC Nantes.

Honours
Nantes
Coupe de France: 2021–22

References

External links
 

1996 births
Living people
French people of Guadeloupean descent
Association football midfielders
French footballers
France under-21 international footballers
Guadeloupean footballers
En Avant Guingamp players
FC Nantes players
Ligue 1 players